1900 in philosophy

Events 
 American Philosophical Association founded.

Publications 
 Edmund Husserl, Logical Investigations (1900)
 Nitobe Inazō, Bushido: The Soul of Japan (1900)
 George Herbert Mead, Suggestions Towards a Theory of the Philosophical Disciplines (1900)

Births 
 January 15 - R. B. Braithwaite (died 1990)
 February 11 - Hans-Georg Gadamer (died 2002)
 February 27 - Keiji Nishitani (died 1990)
 March 23 - Erich Fromm (died 1980)
 April 25 - Wolfgang Pauli (died 1958)
 June 15 - Gotthard Günther (died 1984)
 June 29 - Antoine de Saint-Exupéry (died 1944)
 August 19 - Gilbert Ryle (died 1976)
 November 3 - Leo Löwenthal (died 1993)

Deaths 
 August 25 - Friedrich Nietzsche (born 1844)  
 October 28 - Max Müller (born 1823)

References 

Philosophy
19th-century philosophy
Philosophy by year